Hahncappsia cayugalis is a moth in the family Crambidae described by Hahn William Capps in 1967. It is found in Guatemala, Costa Rica and Mexico (San Luis Potosí, Morelos, Chiapas, Veracruz).

The wingspan is 21–25 mm for males and 26–28 mm for females. Adults have been recorded on wing from April to October.

References

Moths described in 1967
Pyraustinae